ENESSERE is an Italian company, founded in 2009, with headquarters in Brendola and a manufacturer of small vertical wind turbines. Its foundation and the development of the Hercules wind turbine is a response to the Environmental impact of wind power, namely to the aesthetic concerns. Hercules was launched in 2015 as a piece of Design with wooden wings and applying the Golden Ratio. ENESSERE is one of the 100 energy stories that Italy provided to the 2015 United Nations Climate Change Conference in Paris in December 2015.

References

External links
Official website

Wind turbine manufacturers
Small wind turbines
Wind power in Italy
Italian brands